The Russian ironclad Pervenets was a broadside ironclad built for the Imperial Russian Navy in Britain during the 1860s. The ship had to be built abroad as no Russian shipyard had mastered the techniques required to build iron-hulled armored vessels. She was assigned to the Baltic Fleet upon completion and never left Russian waters. Pervenets served with the Gunnery Training Detachment for her entire career until she was reduced to reserve in 1904. She was disarmed and stricken the following year and finally sold in 1908. After the end of the Russian Civil War, the ship was reacquired by the Soviets in 1922 and used to transport and store coal, a role she performed until discarded in the late 1950s. However, she was apparently not scrapped until the early 1960s.

Design and description
The ship was designed as a coast defense vessel to protect the approaches to Saint Petersburg and was referred to as a "self-propelled armored floating battery".  As such, a heavy armament and protection were the most important factors in the ship's design. No Russian shipyard could build iron-hulled, ironclad warships, therefore Pervenets was ordered from Great Britain.  Her name means firstborn and refers to the Tsesarevich, heir to the Russian Empire.

She displaced  and her iron hull had a pronounced tumblehome. Pervenets was fitted with large rams at bow and stern; the stern ram also serving to protect her rudder and propeller. The ship did not steer well and had "an unpredictable habit of suddenly lurching to one side or another", probably as a result of poor water flow to the rudder. She required six men to man her wheel and her total crew numbered 459 officers and men.

Originally intended to use a refurbished engine from the steam ship of the line , Pervenets received a three-cylinder horizontal return-connecting-rod steam engine built by the British firm of Maudslay, Sons and Field. Steam was provided by four rectangular fire-tube boilers. During later trials in the Baltic Sea, Pervenets reached . She was schooner-rigged with three masts; the lower masts were iron and the topmasts and yards were made from pine.

Pervenets was completed with 26 of the most powerful guns available to the Russians, the  60-pounder smoothbore gun. Twenty-four were mounted on the broadside and two guns were placed in pivot mounts on the upper deck to serve as chase guns. Unfortunately, it proved to be incapable of penetrating  of wrought iron armor at a distance of only  during trials in 1859–60. The 60-pounders on the broadside were entirely replaced by a dozen  rifled guns in 1874, while the chase guns were replaced by two four-barreled  4-pounder guns.

The entire ship's side was protected with wrought-iron armor 4.5 inches thick that reduced to  beginning  from the ship's ends. The ship's hull was divided by six watertight transverse and two longitudinal bulkheads for protection against underwater damage. The hull had a tumblehome of 27° to help deflect shells. The open-topped conning tower was also protected by 4.5 inches of armor.

Service
Pervenets was ordered from the Thames Iron Works in Blackwall, London on 18 November 1861 because it was an experienced builder of iron-hulled ships and had begun construction of the broadside ironclad  a few months earlier. Russian naval architects and workmen were sent to London to learn the techniques used by the British shipyard. Construction of the ship actually began the following month and she was launched on 18 May 1863. While running sea trials on 6 August 1863 at Woolwich, Pervenets accidentally rammed the training ship , although little damage was inflicted. Escorted by the steam frigate , she left for Russia two days later with a British crew. The ship reached Kronstadt on 17 August and was fitted out there. Pervenets entered service on 28 July 1864 and was assigned to the Baltic Fleet. Including delivery and fitting out costs, she cost a total of 917,000 rubles.

The ship was assigned to the Gunnery Training Detachment for her entire career and was frequently rearmed to train officers and men on some of the latest guns to enter service. In 1881 she mounted ten 8-inch and two  rifled breech loaders on her gun deck and carried two more 6-inch rifles on the upper deck as chase guns. The mortar was removed in 1881 as it strained the ship's structure. By 1890, these guns had been replaced by two , two 47 mm, and four 37 mm guns.

Pervenets rolled heavily in service, therefore bilge keels were fitted during the winter of 1864–65, the first used on a Russian ship. Pervenets rescued some of the survivors. To alleviate the cramped conditions of the steersmen, the ship's wheel was transferred from the gun deck to a platform that spanned her bulwarks in front of the mizzenmast in 1871. In 1872 she evaluated the Davydov fire-control system that could fire all guns electrically and indicated to the gunners where their guns should be aimed. The conning tower was removed in 1876–77 and new boilers were installed. She was reclassified as a coast defense ironclad on 13 February 1892 and was placed in reserve on 23 December 1904. The ship was disarmed the following year and stricken from the Navy List on 15 September 1905. Turned over to the Port of Kronstadt for disposal, she was sold on 8 September 1908 and renamed Barge No. 1 (Barzha No. 1).

The Soviets acquired the ship on 30 June 1922 and she was used to transport coal to Kronstadt. Barzha No. 1 was transferred to the Baltic Fleet on 7 August 1925 for use as a coal hulk. She was renamed KP-3 on 1 January 1932, K-41999 on 12 July 1943 and VSN-491000 on 16 May 1949. The ship was discarded in the late 1950s, but was apparently not scrapped until the early 1960s.

Notes

Footnotes

References

 
 

Naval ships of Russia
1863 ships
Ironclad warships of the Imperial Russian Navy
Ships built in Leamouth
Maritime incidents in August 1863